Gloeocystidiellum is a single genus of fungi in the monotypic Gloeocystidiellaceae family. Its species form crust-like, smooth fruitbodies. It is probably polyphyletic and may be restricted to the group around the type species G. porosum.

Species

References

Russulales
Russulales genera